Death Wish or Deathwish may refer to:

Common meanings
Suicidal ideation, term for thoughts about killing oneself
Death drive, term in Freudian psychiatry

Arts and entertainment

Radio
"Death Wish", a 1957 episode of the radio series X Minus One

Literature
Death Wish (novel), a 1972 novel by Brian Garfield
Death Wish, a strip in British comic Valiant from 1975
 Deathwish, a character appearing in issue 5 of the 1993 Hardware comic universe

Film
Death Wish (1974 film), a 1974 film based on the 1972 Brian Garfield novel
Death Wish (film series), a series of four films following the 1974 original
Death Wish (2018 film), a remake of the 1974 film

Television
"Death Wish" (Star Trek: Voyager), a 1996 episode of Star Trek: Voyager
Death Wish Live, a 2006 reality show programming block on Channel 4
A concept in Smoke Gets in Your Eyes, the pilot episode of Mad Men

Music
Death Wish (soundtrack), composed by Herbie Hancock for the 1974 film
 "Deathwish", a song by British rock band The Police from the 1979 album Reggatta de Blanc
 Deathwish (EP), a 1984 EP by American gothic rock band Christian Death
 Deathwish Inc., an American music label formed in 2000
 "Death Wish" (song), a song by American rapper Jadakiss from the 2009 album The Last Kiss
 "Death Wish", a song from the soundtrack of Danganronpa: Trigger Happy Havoc

Other uses
Death Wish Coffee, a brand based in Round Lake, New York
 Deathwish, a skateboard company, sister company of Baker Skateboards

See also 

 Death Note